Charles Young may refer to:
Charles Young (American football) (c. 1867–1908), American college football coach at the University of Missouri
Charles Young (Australian footballer) (1905–1980), Australian footballer
Charles Young (cricketer) (1852–1913), English cricketer
Charles Young (governor) (1812–?), colonial administrator for Prince Edward Island
Charles Young (musician) (1686–1758), English organist and composer
Charles Young (officer of arms) (1795–1869), English heraldic officer
Charles Young (United States Army officer) (1864–1922), African American general
Charles Alexander Young (1856–1928), merchant and politician in Manitoba, Canada
Charles Augustus Young (1834–1908), American astronomer
Charles E. Young (born 1931), American professor and university administrator
Charles L. Young Sr. (1931–2009), American businessman and politician from Mississippi
Charles Mayne Young (1777–1856), English actor
Charles Morris Young (1869-1964), American painter
Charles Rochester Young (born 1965), American composer, music educator, conductor and saxophonist
Charles Young, 7th Baronet (1839–1887), English barrister
Charles Young Jr. (born 1962), member of the Mississippi House of Representatives
Charles Burney Young (1824–1904), landholder, winemaker and politician in South Australia
Charles Young (Conservative politician) (1850–1928), English educationalist and Conservative politician
Charles Frederick Young (1819–1874), Australian actor, comedian and theatrical manager
Charles de Young (1845–1880), co-founded the newspaper that would become the San Francisco Chronicle

See also
Charlie Young (disambiguation)
Charle Young (born 1951), former American football tight end
Bill Young (Charles William Young, 1930-2013), American politician